Mundo Gordo is a 2022 Peruvian romantic comedy film directed by Sandro Ventura and written by Italo Carrera & Daniel San Román. It is based on the stand-up comedy of the same name released in 2019 and early 2020. It stars Micky Vargas, Daniela Feijoó, Renzo Schuller and Jesús Alzamora.

Synopsis 
The unfunny micro-businessman and comedian Antonio (Miguel Vargas) is in love with his childhood friend Cynthia (Daniela Feijoo), but his overweight, for which he has been called "fat" all his life, prevents him from declaring himself. When he discovers that she longs for her boss Genaro (Jesús Alzamora), he will execute a plan to win her over.

Cast 

 Miguel Vargas as Antonio
 Daniela Feijoó as Cynthia
 Jesús Alzamora as Gerardo
 Renzo Schuller as Gabriel
 Camucha Negrete as Adriana
 Regina Alcóver as Miryam
 Sandra Vergara as Claudia
 Ximena Hoyos as Katherina

Production 
Filming began in early March 2020, but filming was interrupted by the Covid-19 pandemic. In December 2020, the filming resumed using all covid-19 measures.

Release 
Mundo Gordo premiered on 1 September 2022 in Peruvian theaters It premiered on 19 September 2022 in Austin, Texas as part of the Austin-Lima Sister Cities event.

Reception 
The film brought more than 56,000 spectators to the cinema in its first week of release.

Awards

References

External links 

 

2022 films
2022 romantic comedy films
Peruvian romantic comedy films
Big Bang Films films
2020s Peruvian films
2020s Spanish-language films
Films set in Peru
Films shot in Peru
Films about obesity
Films impacted by the COVID-19 pandemic